Robert C. Holub (born August 22, 1949) served as chancellor of the University of Massachusetts Amherst, beginning his tenure as chancellor in August 2008. Holub stepped down from the chancellorship in July 2012, following his fourth year in office.

Early life and education
Holub was born in Neptune, New Jersey, growing up in the state and becoming the first member of his family to attend college. Holub received his bachelor's degree in natural science from the University of Pennsylvania in 1971, going on to earn master's degrees in Comparative Literature (in 1973) and German (in 1976) and a Ph.D in German (1979) from the University of Wisconsin-Madison.

Academic appointments
Serving as a Professor of German at the University of California-Berkeley (full professor from 1989 on), he became a leading scholar of 19th and 20th century German intellectual, cultural, and literary history. At Berkeley, he also served as the Undergraduate Dean, College of Letters and Science from 2003-2006, before taking the position of Provost and Vice Chancellor for Academic Affairs at the University of Tennessee, which he held from 2006 to 2008 before taking the chancellor position at UMass.

Publications

Heinrich Heine’s Reception of German Grecophilia: The Function and Application of the Hellenic Tradition in the First Half of the Nineteenth Century (Heidelberg: Universitätsverlag Carl Winter, 1981).
Reception Theory: A Critical Introduction (London and York: Methuen, 1984).
Reflections of Realism: Paradox, Norm, and Ideology in Nineteenth-Century German Prose (Detroit: Wayne State University Press, 1991).
Jürgen Habermas: Critic in the Public Sphere (London: Routledge, 1991).
Crossing Borders: Reception Theory, Poststructuralism, Deconstruction (Madison: University of Wisconsin Press, 1992).
Friedrich Nietzsche (New York: Twayne Publishers, 1995).
Nietzsche’s Jewish Problem: Between Anti-Semitism and Anti-Judaism (Princeton and Oxford: Princeton University Press, 2016).

References

Leaders of the University of Massachusetts Amherst
University of Pennsylvania alumni
University of Wisconsin–Madison College of Letters and Science alumni
Living people
1949 births
University of California, Berkeley faculty
University of California, Berkeley Department of German faculty
Professors of German in the United States